Nectandra micranthera is a species of plant in the family Lauraceae. It is endemic to Brazil.  It is threatened by habitat loss.

References

micranthera
Endemic flora of Brazil
Flora of Bahia
Vulnerable flora of South America
Taxonomy articles created by Polbot